The men's 4 × 100 metre relay event at the 2008 Olympic Games took place on 21 and 22 August at the Beijing National Stadium.

There were 16 NOCs competing at this event. These 16 NOCs were selected by the average of the two best marks at the qualifying period. Australia was 14th but withdrew and the Netherlands was invited instead. The final was won by Jamaica in the new world-record time 37.10.

On 25 January 2017, the Jamaican team was stripped of the gold medal place due to Nesta Carter testing positive for the prohibited substance methylhexaneamine. The IOC requested that the IAAF modify the results, and, after CAS dismissed the appeal of Jamaican sprinter, the medals were redistributed accordingly. Trinidad and Tobago team was advanced to gold, Japan to silver, and Brazil to bronze.

Records
Prior to this competition, the existing world and Olympic records were as follows.

Qualification summary

Results
All times shown are in seconds.
Q denotes automatic qualification.
q denotes fastest losers.
DNS denotes did not start.
DNF denotes did not finish.
DSQ denotes disqualified
AR denotes area record.
NR denotes national record.
PB denotes personal best.
SB denotes season's best.

Heats
First 3 in each heat(Q) and the next 2 fastest(q) advance to the Final.

Heat 1

Heat 2

Final

 Note: * Indicates athletes who ran in heats and also received medals.

References

Athletics at the 2008 Summer Olympics
Relay foot races at the Olympics
Olympics 2008
Men's events at the 2008 Summer Olympics